WKBA (1550 kHz, "Classic Country 93.1") is a broadcast radio station licensed to Vinton, Virginia, serving Roanoke and the Roanoke Valley in Virginia.  WKBA is owned and operated by Tinker Creek Broadcasters, Inc. It mostly simulcasts WBRF in Galax, Virginia. 

Previously, WKBA was a religious station known as "The Ministry Station".

Translator
WKBA also broadcasts on the following FM translator:

Previous logo

References

External links

1961 establishments in Virginia
Radio stations established in 1961
KBA
Roanoke County, Virginia